Elizabeth Wynne Fremantle (19 April 1778 – 2 November 1857) was born at Falkingham, now Folkingham, Lincolnshire, and died in or near Nice in France. She was the main author of the extensive Wynne Diaries and wife of the Royal Navy officer Thomas Fremantle (1765–1819), a close associate of Nelson.

Life
Known in the family as Betsey, she was born Elizabeth Wynne, the second daughter of Richard Wynne (1744–1799) and his wife Camille (born de Royer, died 1799), who were Roman Catholics. Wynne was a fast liver, later a friend of Casanova. He got into financial difficulties in 1786, sold his Lincolnshire estate, and took his family abroad. Elizabeth married Fremantle in 1797, after he had rescued her and her family from Leghorn (Livorno) during the 1796 French invasion of Italy and taken them to safety in Corsica. The marriage took place in Naples on 12 January 1797, at the house of the British envoy, Sir William and Lady Hamilton, who took care of the arrangements.

Thomas Fremantle bought the manor of Swanbourne, Buckinghamshire, for his family in 1798 for 900 guineas. Elizabeth lived there for the rest of her life. The Fremantles' children included: Thomas (1798–1890), a Tory politician later created 1st Baron Cottesloe; a daughter Emma (born 13 June 1799); Charles (1800–1869), a Royal Navy officer after whom the city of Fremantle in Western Australia is named; William Robert (c. 1809–1895), who became Anglican dean of Ripon in Yorkshire; and Stephen Grenville Fremantle (1810–1860), captain in command of HMS Juno from 1853 to 1858.

Privately, Elizabeth lost sympathy with Lady Hamilton and Nelson when their conspicuous affair became known: "I had a letter from my husband today.... Lady Nelson is suing for a separate maintenance. I have no patience with her husband, at his age and such a cripple to play the fool with Lady Hamilton." Fremantle, in command of the Ganges, distinguished himself at the Battle of Copenhagen in 1801 under Nelson's command. He was also prominent at Trafalgar in 1805. Elizabeth bore her husband's absences at sea with difficulty, especially as her family grew. They kept up an intimate correspondence, which is spliced into the 1952 edition of the diaries. They received a good deal of hospitality from the family of Lord Buckingham, who lived nearby at Stowe. Buckingham as a figure close to the government was a help to Fremantle in his naval career.

The Wynne Diaries
Elizabeth began to keep her lifelong diaries at the age of eleven. The early parts, which run from 1789 to 1857 in 41 manuscript volumes, provide a vivid and informative account of a well-connected English family in Europe (mainly in Germany and Italy). The bulk of them were written by Elizabeth, but diaries of her younger sisters Eugenia (born 1780) and Harriet (born 1786) have also survived. The first two years of Elizabeth's are in French and the rest in English, with some passages in French and German.

The diaries, except for one notebook covering part of 1796, which was lost at sea, were preserved by the Fremantle family, but remained unpublished until the 1930s. Swanbourne House is still owned by the Fremantle family trust, but now let to a coeducational prep school.

Commemoration
The Betsey Wynne public house and restaurant in Swanbourne, Buckinghamshire, was built in 2006 by the Fremantle Trust, a body run by Thomas Henry Fremantle and his father John Fremantle, 5th Baron Cottesloe.

The building work cost almost £1 million. It was opened by Wynne's great-great-great granddaughter, Elizabeth Betsy Duncan Smith, and her husband, the politician Iain Duncan Smith.

References

1778 births
1857 deaths
Women diarists
English diarists
People from Folkingham
English Roman Catholics
19th-century diarists